Oliver Leon Jones (born June 27th 1991), known professionally as Oliver Stark, is a British actor. He is best known for his roles as Evan "Buck" Buckley in 9-1-1 on Fox, and as Ryder in AMC's martial arts-based drama Into the Badlands.

Biography
Stark was born in London, England. He is the younger of two brothers. He attended Hendon School in north west London from 2002 to 2009. After joining the acting union in the UK, he registered under the name "Oliver Stark" as "Oliver Jones" was not available. He decided to use his late grandmother's maiden name, "Stark", as his stage surname.  

Stark's first professional acting job came in 2011 when he was cast in David Alexander's short film Follow for the UK Film Council. Stark then went on to have guest roles on iconic British shows Luther and Casualty.

Stark then had a number of film roles (Underworld Blood Wars) and other TV roles before starring as series regular, Ryder, in AMC's martial arts-based drama Into the Badlands in 2015. Since 2018, Stark has played firefighter Evan "Buck" Buckley, a main character on the Fox drama, 9-1-1.

Stark is a vegan, a feminist, and has expressed support for the Black Lives Matter movement. As of 2021, he works with a charity which provides workout equipment to firehouses to help firefighters stay in shape. He has a distinctive birthmark on his face, which an acting teacher advised him to remove. He stated that he has "never had an issue with it", and many fans of 9-1-1 have sent him positive messages about his birthmark.

Stark currently resides in Los Angeles, California with his dog and cat. Since 2016, he has been in a relationship with model and actress Hannah Gottesman.

Filmography

Film

Television

References

External links

1991 births
Living people
British male film actors
British male television actors